Joan of Arc at the Stake (Italian: Giovanna d'Arco al rogo) is a 1954 Italian film directed by Roberto Rossellini and starring his wife Ingrid Bergman, which shows a live performance in December 1953 at the San Carlo Theatre in Naples. It is based on the oratorio Jeanne d'Arc au bûcher by Paul Claudel and Arthur Honegger. It was filmed using a color process called Gevacolor.

Plot
The film takes place mostly in a surrealistic fantasy around the time of the execution of Joan of Arc. Joan of Arc, played by Ingrid Bergman, is being burned alive for heresy. In a kind of dream state, she departs from her body and looks back upon her life. She begins this journey depressed and demoralized. However, a priest appears to help guide her. First, he shows her those who accused her in the guise of animal characters, in order to show her their true nature. Then, he shows her the good that she has performed for people. In the end, she is proud of what she has done and is ready to face the flames.

Reception
Like most Bergman and Rossellini collaborations, it did not perform well at the box office.

References

External links 
 

1954 films
1950s historical drama films
Italian epic films
Italian historical drama films
1950s Italian-language films
Films directed by Roberto Rossellini
Films about Joan of Arc
Films about Christianity
Religious epic films
1954 drama films
Films scored by Arthur Honegger
1950s Italian films